Ian Duncan Fraser OBE DSC (11 September 1921 - 7 March 2015) was a Royal Navy Flight Lieutenant who disabled the Italian cruiser Luigi di Savoia Duca degli Abruzzi with a torpedo during the Second World War. Fraser later served as a diplomat.

References

1921 births
2015 deaths
People from Solihull
Officers of the Order of the British Empire
Recipients of the Distinguished Service Cross (United Kingdom)